Gev. Mancharsha Avari  is an Indian politician. He was elected  to the Lok Sabha, the lower house of the Parliament of India, from Nagpur as a member of the Indian National Congress in 1977.

References

External Links
Official biographical sketch in Parliament of India website
India MPs 1977–1979
Lok Sabha members from Maharashtra
1950 births
Indian National Congress politicians from Maharashtra